Newton Flotman, a village and civil parish in the English county of Norfolk, lies about 8 miles (13 km) south of Norwich on the A140 road between Tasburgh and Swainsthorpe. The River Tas flows through. The area of  had 1,197 inhabitants in 497 households at the 2001 census, increasing to 1,489 at the 2011 census. For local government it lies in the district of South Norfolk. The name means "new farm/settlement". The de Ferers family held land there in the 13th century.

Governance
An electoral ward of the same name exists. This stretches west to Wreningham, with a total population taken at the 2011 census of 2,658.

Facilities and amenities
Newton Flotman Church, St Mary's, is served by the Tas Valley team ministry along with those of Swainsthorpe, Tasburgh, Tharston, Saxlingham and Shotesham. In 2006, an extension with a kitchen and toilet facilities opened to provide a larger meeting space. In 2018, the church received £87,600 from the Heritage Lottery Fund to repair the church roof, tower and drainage system, install Wi-Fi and train local volunteers to produce films on the church's heritage.

Newton Flotman Primary School caters for children in Newton Flotman, Swainsthorpe and Saxlingham Thorpe. The nearest secondary school is Long Stratton High School.

The village has a village hall, a motorcycle garage and a theatre school known as ARTS, but lacks a shop. There is an area known as Smockmill Common, managed by South Norfolk District Council, in Saxlingham Thorpe near Newton Flotman, which is used for recreational purposes. Newton Flotman Football Club is based in the village.

An Elizabethan Country mansion, Rainthorpe Hall, stands by the road between Newton Flotman and Flordon.

Transport
The village stands by the A140 road between Cromer, North Norfolk, and Ipswich, Suffolk. Newton Flotman has regular buses to Norwich and Long Stratton, operated by First Norfolk & Suffolk and Simonds of Botesdale.

The railway line between Norwich and London's Liverpool Street station passes the west side of the village at a level crossing, but there is no station. The nearest is at Norwich.

Notable residents
The village was the home of the Blonumvyll or Blunderville family in the 15th century: Richard & William. Thomas Blundeville (c. 1522–1606), humanist writer, mathematician and inventor of the protractor lived as a country gentleman in the village. Blundeville Manor is the name of a cul de sac in the village.

Brighton's Road, one of the main streets that run through the village, is named after J. L. Brighton, who was chairman of the parish council for 41 years. Brighton was succeeded as chairman by Alan King, who held the post for 14 years. Alan King Playing Field, King's Green, Kingsway and Alan Avenue are all places in the village named after him.

References

http://kepn.nottingham.ac.uk/map/place/Norfolk/Newton%20Flotman

External links

Newton Flotman Football Club

South Norfolk
Villages in Norfolk
Civil parishes in Norfolk